Der Kongress der Pinguine is a Swiss philosophical documentary film by Director Hans-Ulrich Schlumpf with a narrative by Franz Hohler about someone visiting Antarctica and finding an assembly of penguins. It is similar to the film March of the Penguins although it predates it by over 10 years.

External links

1993 films
Environmental films
Swiss documentary films
Anti-modernist films
Documentary films about nature
1993 documentary films
Documentary films about Antarctica